National Union Party was a royalist party in Iran, established as an offshoot of the fraction of the same name in the Iranian Parliament.

The party advocated supporting the Shah and pursuing social conservative programs, while seeking American aid, especially military aid to counterbalance the influence of Britain and Soviet Union.

With a conservative background, the party spoke on advantages of socialism and renamed itself to People's Party in August 1944 to challenge Tudeh Party of Iran.

References

1944 establishments in Iran
Anti-communist parties
Centrist parties in Iran
Conservative parties in Iran
Defunct conservative parties
Defunct socialist parties in Iran
Monarchist parties in Iran
Political parties established in 1944
Political parties in Pahlavi Iran (1941–1979)
Political parties with year of disestablishment missing